Rail Transport in Tunisia is provided by:
 Tunisian Railways (SNCFT)
 Société des transports de Tunis,  manages commuter trains of the Tunis area including metro light rail and TGM in Tunis
 Sahel Metro, company and electric train line Sousse-Monastir-Mahdia
 Lézard rouge, a historical tourist train

Electrification 

 25 kV AC Tunis to the suburbs of Borj Cédria and Riadh (2012)

Railway links to adjacent countries 
 Algeria - 
 Libya - railways under construction - break-of-gauge - / until gauge conversion (some  gauge would need to be converted to ).

See also

 Economy of Tunisia
 Transport in Tunisia
 Railway stations in Tunisia

References

Notes

Further reading

External links

 EngRailHistory The Railways of Morocco, Tunisia, and Algeria